Ikeda may refer to:

 Ikeda (surname), a Japanese surname
 Ikeda (comics), a character in Usagi Yojimbo
 Ikeda clan, a Japanese clan
 Ikeda map, chaotic attractor
 Ikeda (annelid) a genus of the family Ikedidae
 Ikeda, a Brazilian e-commerce company acquired by Rakuten

Places
 Ikeda, Osaka in Osaka Prefecture, Japan
 Ikeda, Fukui, Japan
 Ikeda, Gifu, Japan
 Ikeda, Hokkaidō, Japan
 Ikeda, Kagawa, Shōzu District, Kagawa, Japan
 Ikeda, Nagano, Japan
 Ikeda, Tokushima, Miyoshi District, Tokushima, Japan
 Lake Ikeda, Japan
 Ikeda, Gunma, Japan
 Ikeda Peace Institute in Cambridge, Massachusetts
 Ikeda Route in Osaka and Hyōgo Prefectures, Japan